Woody Platt is a Grammy Award-winning, American guitar player and vocalist specializing in bluegrass music. He is best known for his work with the band Steep Canyon Rangers along with banjo player and comedian Steve Martin.

References

American bluegrass guitarists
American bluegrass musicians
Grammy Award for Best Bluegrass Album
People from Brevard, North Carolina
Musicians from North Carolina
Living people
Year of birth missing (living people)